Rayapur  is a Village Development Committee in Saptari District in the Sagarmatha Zone of south-eastern Nepal. At the time of the 1991 Nepal census it had a population of 9573.

References

Populated places in Saptari District
VDCs in Saptari District